No Rainbow in the Sky is a novel by F. J. Thwaites.

It was adapted into radio in 1965.

Beyond the Rainbow

Beyond the Rainbow is a novel by F. J. Thwaites.

It was a sequel to No Rainbow in the Sky.

It was adapted for radio in 1966.

References

External links
No Rainbow in the Sky at AustLit
Beyond the Rainbow at AustLit

1959 Australian novels